Frank Burt Freidel, Jr. (May 22, 1916 – January 25, 1993) was an American historian, the first major biographer of former President Franklin Delano Roosevelt and one of the first scholars to work on his papers stored in the Roosevelt Library in Hyde Park, New York.

Biography
Freidel was born in Brooklyn, New York of Quaker parents, Edith (Heacock) and Frank Burt Freidel. He was raised in Plattsburgh, New York and parts of Southern California as his father struggled to support the family during the Great Depression.  He received his B.A. (1937) and M.A. (1939) from the University of Southern California, then pursued his Ph.D. from the University of Wisconsin-Madison, under the direction of William B. Hesseltine, graduating in 1942.  His doctoral thesis was on 19th-century jurist Francis Lieber.  His contemporaries at Wisconsin included Richard N. Current and T. Harry Williams, who later collectively authored with Freidel a U.S. history textbook, A History of the United States, dedicated to Hesseltine.  His first academic appointment was in 1941 to Shurtleff College.

Freidel married twice, divorced once, and had eight children.

After years spent wandering to Shurtleff College, the University of Maryland, Pennsylvania State University, Vassar College, the University of Illinois, Urbana-Champaign, and Stanford University (1953), Freidel joined the faculty of Harvard University in 1955, and remained there until his retirement in 1981; in 1972 he was appointed the Charles Warren Professor of History.  He served on the Department of the Army Historical Advisory Committee in 1973-1976.  Following his retirement from Harvard, Freidel joined the department of history at the University of Washington, where he was [Bullitt Professor of History] in 1981-1986.

At various times Freidel was president of the Organization of American Historians, the New England History Teachers' Association, and the New England Historical Association.

Freidel's magnum opus was his 5-volume biography of Franklin Delano Roosevelt: "The Apprenticeship" (1952), "The Ordeal" (1954), "The Triumph" (1956), "F.D.R. and the South" (1965), and "Launching the New Deal" (1973).  After publishing a one-volume condensed biography Franklin D. Roosevelt: A Rendezvous with Destiny in 1990, Freidel died in Cambridge, Massachusetts in 1993 of pneumonia and cancer while living in Belmont, Massachusetts, leaving the sixth volume unfinished.

Awards and Prizes
 1964 Guggenheim Fellowship for Humanities
 1966-1967 President of the New England Historical Association
 1975-1976 President of the Organization of American Historians

Bibliography
Franklin D. Roosevelt: The Apprenticeship (1952)
Franklin D. Roosevelt: The Ordeal (1954)
Franklin D. Roosevelt: The Triumph (1956)
Splendid Little War (1958)
A History of the United States (2 vols.) (with Richard N. Current and T. Harry Williams) (Knopf, 1959)
America in the Twentieth Century (1960) (with Alan Brinkley)
A History of the United States (Since 1865) (with Richard N. Current and T. Harry Williams) (1960)
American History: A Survey (with Richard N. Current, T. Harry Williams, and Alan Brinkley) (1961)
A History of the United States to 1877 (with Richard N. Current and T. Harry Williams (1964)
F.D.R. and the South (1965)
Franklin D. Roosevelt: Launching the New Deal (1973)
The Harvard Guide to American History, Revised Edition (assisted by Richard K. Showman) (January 1974)
Franklin D. Roosevelt: A Rendezvous with Destiny (1990)
The Presidents of the United States of America (1998). Foreword by William Jefferson Clinton.

References

Further reading 
 
 
http://quintardtaylor.com/frank-burt-freidel-jr-1916-1993-bullitt-chair-1981-1986
http://www.gf.org/fellows/all?index=f&page=12
 

1916 births
1993 deaths
Franklin D. Roosevelt
University of Wisconsin–Madison alumni
Historians of the United States
Harvard University faculty
University of Washington faculty
20th-century American historians
American male non-fiction writers
20th-century American male writers